Darius Theus (born January 12, 1990) is an American former basketball player. He played collegiately for VCU. He played professionally in the Netherlands and Germany.

Professional career
In 2013, Theus signed his first pro contract with Aris Leeuwarden, a team in the Dutch Basketball League. He led the DBL in scoring, steals and field goal percentage in the 2013–14 season. Theus got a place in the All-Defense Team of the DBL as well and was also named DBL Statistical Player of the Year. Aris went into the Playoffs as the 7-seed and lost 2–0 to SPM Shoeters Den Bosch.

Coaching career
He started as Director of Player Development with the Texas Longhorns on April 20, 2017. He held the position for the 2017–18 season.

Honours
Aris Leeuwarden
DBL All-Star (1): 2014
DBL Statistical Player of the Year (1): 2014
DBL All-Defense Team (1): 2014
DBL scoring leader (1): 2014
DBL steals leader (1): 2014

References

External links
Draft Express profile and statistics
Dutch Basketball League profile and statistics 

1990 births
Living people
American expatriate basketball people in Germany
American expatriate basketball people in the Netherlands
American men's basketball players
Aris Leeuwarden players
Basketball players from Virginia
Dutch Basketball League players
Nürnberg Falcons BC players
Point guards
SC Rasta Vechta players
Sportspeople from Portsmouth, Virginia
VCU Rams men's basketball players